Kovačevac is a village in the municipality of Jezero, Bosnia and Herzegovina.

Demographics 
According to the 2013 census, its population was 96.

References

Populated places in Jezero, Bosnia and Herzegovina
Villages in Republika Srpska